Centennial Grounds or Centennial Park was a baseball ground in Philadelphia, Pennsylvania. It was home to the short-lived Philadelphia Centennials baseball club of the National Association during the 1875 season, so it is considered a major league ballpark by those who count the NA as a major league. It was also the site of one home game by the Athletics. It occupied the same block as the later Recreation Park.

References
 Retrosheet. "Park Directory". Retrieved 2006-09-04.
 Retrosheet game log for Centennial Park - live link as of January 2019

Defunct sports venues in Philadelphia
Defunct baseball venues in the United States
Baseball venues in Pennsylvania